Csabaszabadi is a village in Békés County, Southern Great Plain, Hungary.

Geography
It covers an area of 32.71 km² and has a population of 380 people (2002).

Populated places in Békés County